The Haize Hegoa type patrol boats are a series of eight swift boats used by the Directorate-general of customs and indirect taxes, the French customs service. Haize Hegoa means southern wind in the Basque language.

Ships in class 
 Alizé (DF31)
 Haize Hegoa (DF43)
 Kan Avel (DF36)
 Mervent (DF44)
 Lissero (DF47)
 Vent d'aval (DF37)
 Vent d'autan (DF45)
 Avel Sterenn (DF46)

External links 

  DF 46 Avel Sterenn : vedette des Douanes Françaises, bateaux-de-saint-malo.com
  DF 12 Noroit : vedette des Douanes Françaises, bateaux-de-saint-malo.com

Patrol vessels